Henry Neil Castles (October 1, 1934 – August 4, 2022) was an American NASCAR Grand National and Winston Cup Series driver.  He raced from 1957 to 1976, and won the NASCAR Grand National East Series in 1972.

Early life
Castles was born in Marion, North Carolina, on October 1, 1934.  He was raised in nearby Charlotte.  When he was nine, he was gifted a car to drive at a soapbox derby racer by Buddy Shuman, who also gave Castles the nickname "Soapy".  As a teenager, Castles worked on Shuman's cars and cleaned his tools at the latter's shop.

Career
Castles made his NASCAR Cup Series debut in June 1957 at Columbia Speedway, finishing 51 laps before engine failure forced him to record a did not finish. He went on to win 25-lap qualifying races at Darlington Raceway (1967) and Rockingham Speedway (1969). Three years later, he won the NASCAR Grand National East Series, a second-level series beneath the Winston Cup Series, which would ultimately prove to be his most successful NASCAR campaign. He also won at the Greenville-Pickens Speedway in the spring of 1972. Even though he failed to win a race in his nineteen-year career, Castles managed to record 51 finishes in the top five and 178 finishes in the top ten. Out of 90,509 laps, Castles led 70 of them.

There was a short story about Castles from American Zoom, a book authored by Peter Golenbock.  Castles was an also-ran of the old days who once found himself having an uncharacteristically good day.  He had lapped Curtis Turner, but the flagman apparently did not believe it, for he kept giving Castles the move-over flag to let Turner around him.  As Castles told the story: "The starter kept doing this, and I was getting real mad, so I just picked up my gun and when I come by the stand the next time I took aim and shot that flag out of his hand."

By the end of his racing career, Castles managed to earn $276,854 in total winnings ($ when adjusted for inflation).  At the time of his death, his 498 starts in the NASCAR Cup Series were the third-most by a driver who did not have a victory, behind J. D. McDuffie (653) and Buddy Arrington (560).

Castles also worked in the film industry as a stunt driver, beginning in the 1950s about the time that he started racing.  After he and his friends were recruited as extras for filming at the Occoneechee Speedway, he volunteered to replace the stuntman who was stuck in California.  He later featured in that capacity in Thunder Road (1958), Speedway (1968, doubling for Elvis Presley), The Last American Hero (1973), Greased Lightning (1977), and Six Pack (1982).  He also acted in The Night of the Cat (1973) and Challenge (1974).

In 2019, Castles published a memoir of his life in NASCAR and in the film industry.

Personal life
Castles was married to Iris Jean Gallion for 63 years until her death in December 2019.  Together, they had three children.

Castles died on August 4, 2022, at the age of 87.

References

External links

 Legends of NASCAR
 NASCAR.com's 1969 season recap

Books
 
 

1934 births
2022 deaths
NASCAR drivers
NASCAR team owners
Racing drivers from Charlotte, North Carolina